Infiltrator II (known as Infiltrator Part II: The Next Day in-game and Infiltrator on the NES) is a 1987 video game published by Mindscape and developed by Chris Gray Enterprises.

Gameplay
Infiltrator II is a game in which the player must fly a Gizmo DHX2 into enemy air space and infiltrate their ground installation.

Reception
M. Evan Brooks reviewed the game for Computer Gaming World, and stated that "While it is a credible job overall, this reviewer's hesitancy in offering a recommendation is that the product is more difficult than the normal arcade product. Given that difficulty, when compared against the likes of Gunship, it obviously falls short in both realism and replay value. If one is more inclined towards the arcade spectrum, however, Infiltrator II should fill the bill."

Computer and Video Games - Apr, 1988
ACE (Advanced Computer Entertainment) - Jul, 1988
The Games Machine - Jul, 1988
ASM (Aktueller Software Markt) - May, 1988
Computer Gaming World - Nov, 1992
Computer Gaming World - Jun, 1991

References

External links
Review in Zzap!
Review in Your Commodore
Review in RUN Magazine
Review in Commodore User

1987 video games
Apple II games
Commodore 64 games
DOS games
Helicopter video games
Mindscape games
Nintendo Entertainment System games
Science fiction video games
Stealth video games
Video games developed in Canada